Joseph Langford Haycock (1850 – 1937) was an Ontario farmer and political figure. He represented Frontenac in the Legislative Assembly of Ontario as a Liberal-Patrons of Industry member from 1894 to 1898.

He was born in Lennox County, Canada West, the son of Frederick Haycock, who came from England in 1837. He was also an auctioneer. Haycock was reeve of Kingston Township for seven years. He was leader of the Patrons of Industry in the provincial legislature. He served as president of the Frontenac Agricultural Association. One of Joseph's sons, Alexander Wilkinson Haycock, became a member of the British parliament.

Joseph Langford Haycock died November 22, 1937.

External links 
The Canadian parliamentary companion, 1897 JA Gemmill

1850 births
1937 deaths
Ontario Patrons of Industry MPPs